Adam Puławski is a Polish historian and former researcher for the Institute of National Remembrance (IPN). His research focuses on the Polish Underground State and the Polish government-in-exile and their actions toward the Jewish citizens of Poland during the Holocaust. Puławski has argued that the Polish government often treated Polish Jews as foreigners and their extermination as a secondary issue. In contrast to claims made by the Law and Justice party that the Polish government-in-exile did its best to help the Polish Jews, Puławski found that there were attempts to censor news of the fate of Jews.

Career
After working for the Institute of National Remembrance for eighteen years, in 2018, he was transferred to a different division of the institution where he would not have the opportunity to do historical research. At least 130 historians from various countries, including Timothy Snyder and Norman Davies, signed a letter objecting to this decision and stating that it would not help the credibility of the IPN. Because he was not allowed to do historical research, Puławski quit. Puławski said that the IPN was focusing too much on how Jews treated Poles during the war: "if a Jew survived and had to steal a carrot at the same time, for example because he was starving—now we are to say that this Jew is evil"—and seeking to portray Jews as ungrateful for Polish rescue attempts. In contrast, Puławski believes that in order to achieve an accurate and balanced historical interpretation, it is necessary to examine the entire situation, rather than one aspect of it, and to leave moral judgements to the reader.

Publication of his 2018 book was blocked by the IPN, but Puławski collected 24,000  in donations and had it published by the Rocznik Chełmski association. Writing about Puławski's 2009 book, Wojtek Rappak wrote that his "meticulous study of the flow of information about the Holocaust, from the local to the various higher levels of the underground state and then on to London, looks like the definitive study on the subject." The book was denounced by the right-wing historian Wojciech Muszyński who described Puławski as a "sick man".

In September 2020, he received his habilitation from the Maria Curie-Skłodowska University. He had to pay the fees (about 20,000 ) himself, and has been unemployed for much of the time since leaving the IPN.

Works

References

21st-century Polish historians
People associated with the Institute of National Remembrance
Historians of the Holocaust in Poland
Living people
Year of birth missing (living people)